JJS may refer to:

 Jakarta Japanese School
 Jack and Jill School, in Bacolod City, Philippines
 JJS Karate Dojo, martial arts organization
 Journal of Japanese Studies
 Journal of Jewish Studies
 Utah Division of Juvenile Justice Services
 WJJS, a radio station